Java is an unincorporated community in Pittsylvania County, in the U.S. state of Virginia.
Like many such communities, Java has no focal point beyond a US Post Office alongside the local volunteer fire department building. The community extends east a mile or so into Halifax County. Java contains no manufacturing operations beyond one commercial saw mill which—like local tobacco farms—is a significant employer in the area. That mill and others have increasingly been supplied by logging operations that have, potentially, been creating more farmable land through their clear-cutting practices. A downside to this clearcutting has been a loss of natural habitat for the native wildlife, including deer and bear.

Notable people include international speaker and traveler Alex “Shelly” Lisk and Minnesota Public Radio host Angela Davis.

References

Unincorporated communities in Virginia
Unincorporated communities in Pittsylvania County, Virginia